Charles James Taylor (8 June 1881 – 25 August 1960) was an English cricketer active in the latter half of the first decade of the 1900s, later playing intermittently through the 1920s to the early 1930s. Born at Bedminster, Bristol, Taylor was a right-handed batsman and right-arm fast-medium bowler who made 21 appearances in first-class cricket, though was mostly associated with minor counties cricket.

Taylor made his debut in first-class cricket for Warwickshire against Hampshire in the 1908 County Championship. He made two further first-class appearances for Warwickshire in the 1909 County Championship against Yorkshire and Derbyshire. He then played eighteen times for Somerset in 1910 and 1911. In all, he collected 61 first-class wickets, with his best performance being 6/82. He began playing minor counties cricket for Staffordshire in 1921, playing intermittently in the Minor Counties Championship for the next decade, with fifteen appearances up to 1932. His best match figures for Staffordshire came in 1931 against Denbighshire, when he took 12/72 in the match.

He died  at Leek, Staffordshire on 25 August 1960. His son Frederick Taylor also played first-class cricket.

References

External links
Charles Taylor at ESPNcricinfo
Charles Taylor at CricketArchive

1881 births
1960 deaths
Cricketers from Bristol
English cricketers
Somerset cricketers
Staffordshire cricketers
Warwickshire cricketers